Plague City: SARS in Toronto is a 2005 medical thriller television movie directed by David Wu, set during the 2003 outbreak of severe acute respiratory syndrome (SARS) in Toronto. The locations and characters were composite characters or fictionalized versions of actual Toronto medical personnel and facilities.

Produced by CTV as part of its "Signature Series" of television films dramatizing significant Canadian news stories, it was filmed in Toronto and Hamilton. It was written by Collin Friesen and Pete McCormack.

The film aired on May 29, 2005 on CTV.

Cast
 Kari Matchett as Amy
 Ron White as Dr. Royce		
 Rick Roberts as Dr. Jeremy Neville
 Lannette New as Rosie
 Rahnuma Panthaky as Laura Weston
 Merwin Mondesir as Rob Connell
 George Chiang as Tom Kwan
 Brian Markinson		
 James Gallanders		
 Leslie Carlson	
 Alina Lee as Rosie's Mother
 Grace Lynn Kung as April
 James McGowan as Ed
 Grahame Wood as Paul

Critical response
John Doyle of The Globe and Mail wrote that the film "is in some ways, absurdly ambitious. It tries to capture an entire city's plight while sticking to the facts. It has many mundane TV-movie moments, but it's a grimly compelling production."

Awards

References

External links
 

2002–2004 SARS outbreak
Canadian disaster films
2005 drama films
Canadian films based on actual events
Health in Toronto
2005 television films
2005 films
English-language Canadian films
Films set in Toronto
Films shot in Hamilton, Ontario
Viral respiratory tract infections in fiction
Canadian drama television films
2000s English-language films
2000s Canadian films